The City Lights Pocket Poets Series is a series of poetry collections published by Lawrence Ferlinghetti and City Lights Books of San Francisco since August 1955.

The series is most notable for the publication of Allen Ginsberg's literary milestone "Howl", which led to an obscenity charge for the publishers that was fought off with the aid of the ACLU.

The series is published in a small, affordable paperback format with a distinctive black and white cover design. This design was borrowed from Kenneth Patchen's An Astonished Eye Looks Out of the Air (1945), published by Untide Press in Oregon.

The series gave many readers their first introduction to avant-garde poetry. Many of the poets were members of the Beat Generation and the San Francisco Renaissance, but the volumes included a diverse array of poets, including authors translated from Spanish, German, Russian, and Dutch. According to Ferlinghetti, "From the beginning the aim was to publish across the board, avoiding the provincial and the academic...I had in mind rather an international, dissident, insurgent ferment."

List of books in the City Lights Pocket Poets Series

 Lawrence Ferlinghetti, Pictures of the Gone World, August 1955 (reissued & expanded, 1995; 60th Anniversary Edition, 2015)
 Kenneth Rexroth (translator), Thirty Spanish Poems of Love and Exile, 1956
 Kenneth Patchen, Poems of Humor and Protest, 1956
 Allen Ginsberg, Howl and Other Poems, 1956 (hardcover 40th Anniversary Edition, 1996)
 Marie Ponsot, True Minds, 1956
 Denise Levertov, Here and Now, 1957
 William Carlos Williams, Kora in Hell : Improvisations, 1957
 Gregory Corso, Gasoline, 1958 (reissued with The Vestal Lady on Brattle, 1978)
 Jacques Prévert, Paroles, 1958 (reissued bilingually, 1990)
 Robert Duncan, Selected Poems, 1959
 Jerome Rothenberg (translator), New Young German Poets, 1959
 Nicanor Parra, Anti-Poems, 1960
 Kenneth Patchen, The Love Poems of Kenneth Patchen, 1960
 Allen Ginsberg, Kaddish and Other Poems, 1961 (reissued 50th Anniversary Edition, 2010)
 Robert Nichols, Slow Newsreel of Man Riding Train, 1962
 Yevgeni Yevtuschenko, etc., Anselm Hollo (translator), Red Cats, 1962
 Malcolm Lowry, Selected Poems of Malcolm Lowry, 1962 (reedited and reissued, 2017)
 Allen Ginsberg, Reality Sandwiches, 1963
 Frank O'Hara, Lunch Poems, 1964 (reissued 50th Anniversary Edition, 2014)
 Philip Lamantia, Selected Poems 1943-1966, 1967
 Bob Kaufman, Golden Sardine, 1967
 Janine Pommy-Vega, Poems to Fernando, 1968
 Allen Ginsberg, Planet News, 1961-1967, 1968
 Charles Upton, Panic Grass, 1968
 Pablo Picasso, Hunk of Skin, 1968
 Robert Bly, The Teeth-Mother Naked At Last, 1970
 Diane DiPrima, Revolutionary Letters, 1971
 Jack Kerouac, Scattered Poems, 1971
 Andrei Voznesensky, Dogalypse, 1972
 Allen Ginsberg, The Fall of America, Poems of These States 1965-1971, 1972
 Pete Winslow, A Daisy in the Memory of a Shark, 1973
 Harold Norse, Hotel Nirvana, 1974
 Anne Waldman, Fast Speaking Woman, 1975 (reissued & expanded, 1996)
 Jack Hirschman, Lyripol, 1976
 Allen Ginsberg, Mind Breaths, Poems 1972-1977, 1977
 Stefan Brecht, Poems, 1978
 Peter Orlovsky, Clean Asshole Poems & Smiling Vegetable Songs, 1978
 Antler, Factory, 1980
 Philip Lamantia, Becoming Visible, 1981
 Allen Ginsberg, Plutonian Ode and Other Poems 1977-1980, 1982
 Pier Paolo Pasolini, Roman Poems, 1986 (reissued bilingually, 2005)
 Scott Rollins (editor), Nine Dutch Poets, 1982. Translations of poems by Karel Appel, J. Bernlef, Remco Campert, Jules Deelder, Judith Herzberg, Lucebert, Hans Plomp, Bert Schierbeek, and Simon Vinkenoog. Also includes a text by Anton Constandse.
 Ernesto Cardenal, From Nicaragua With Love, 1986
 Antonio Porta, Kisses From Another Dream, 1987
 Adam Cornford, Animations, 1988
 La Loca, Adventures on the Isle of Adolescence, 1989
 Vladimir Mayakovsky, Listen!, 1991
 Jack Kerouac, Pomes All Sizes, 1992
 Daisy Zamora, Riverbed of Memory, 1992
 Rosario Murillo, Angel in the Deluge, 1992
 Jack Kerouac, The Scripture of the Golden Eternity, 1994
 Alberto Blanco, Dawn of the Senses, 1995
 Julio Cortázar, Save Twilight: Selected Poems, 1997 (reissued in an expanded edition, 2016)
 Dino Campana, Orphic Songs, 1998
 Jack Hirschman, Front Lines: Selected Poems, 2002
 Semezdin Mehmedinovic, Nine Alexandrias, 2003
 Kamau Daaood, The Language of Saxophones, 2005
 Cristina Peri Rossi, State of Exile, 2008
 Tau by Philip Lamantia and Journey to the End by John Hoffman, 2008
 David Meltzer, When I Was A Poet, 2011
 Tongo Eisen-Martin, Heaven Is All Goodbyes, 2017

References

  Introduction, page i. City Lights Pocket Poets Anthology. Lawrence Ferlinghetti, editor. City Lights Books, 1995.
 City Lights Pocket Poets - Cover Story by Marcus Williamson

American poetry collections
City Lights Publishers books